Oleksiy Oleksiiovych Kostusyev (June 29, 1954) is a Ukrainian politician and former mayor of Odesa. Kostusyev is the father of fellow Ukrainian politician Oleksiy Honcharenko Kostusyev divorced Oleksiy's mother when Oleksiy was three years old.

Kostusyev previously served as the head of the Anti-Monopoly Committee of Ukraine, the nation's premier competition regulator.

Family 
Father Oleksiy Oleksiyovych (1928–1983) — Captain of the 1st rank, sailor-border guard; mother Violla Alekseevna (1932) — a doctor. Wife Irina Vasylivna (1965) — engineer; son Goncharenko Oleksiy Oleksiyovych — Deputy of the Verkhovna Rada of Ukraine of VIII and IX convocations; daughter Viola (born 1988) is a student.

Education 
In 1971-1975 he studied at the Odessa Institute of National Economy, majoring in economics. In 2004 he defended his doctoral dissertation on Methodological principles of forming an effective competitive environment in the economy of Ukraine (Odessa State University of Economics).

Biography 
People's Deputy of Ukraine of the 5th convocation 04.-10.2006 from the Party of Regions, № 29 on the list. At the time of the election: Chairman of the Antimonopoly Committee of Ukraine. Member of the Committee on Budget (07.-10.2006), member of the Party of Regions faction (05.-10.2006). He resigned on October 5, 2006.

People's Deputy of Ukraine of the 3rd convocation 03.1998-12.2001 from SPU-SelPU, № 20 on the list. At the time of the election: President of the Charitable Foundation. B. Derevyanka (Odessa). Member of the Socialist Party and SelPU faction (“Left Center”) (from 05.1998), then (until 12.1999) — member of the SPU faction; member of the group “Labor Ukraine” (since 12.1999). Chairman of the Subcommittee on Energy and Energy Saving of the Committee on Fuel and Energy Complex, Nuclear Policy and Nuclear Safety (07.1998-02.2000); Chairman of the Committee on Economic Policy, Department of People. Household, property and investment (02.2000-12.01). He resigned on December 14, 2001. 03.1994 — Cand. in the people. dep. Of Ukraine, October Constituency № 294, Odessa. region, nominee voters, 1st round — 33.33%, 1st place out of 11 votes; 2nd round — 36.45%, 2nd place with 2 pret.

08.1975-01.91 — M.Sc., postgraduate student, assistant, senior teacher, associate professor, head of the department of social flight. theory, Odessa Institute of Naval Engineers. 1976-77 — service in the army. 01.1991-01.93 — head Department, Deputy Chairman for Economic Affairs, Kyiv District Executive Committee of Odessa. 01.1993-07.94 — Chairman, Odessa city privatization committee. Dep. Odessa. City Council dep. (1990-1994). The head of the Assoc. privatization bodies of Ukraine (since 1993). He was the founder and leader of the Odessa Civil Forum. He was a member of the political executive committee of the Labor Ukraine party (since 11.2000). Chairman of the Flight Party "Union" (10.2004-11.05). President of the Charitable Foundation named after B. Derevyanka (Odessa) (1998). Member Nat. councils for coordination of activities of national and regional bodies and local self-government (since 12.2000); member of the Nat. Council for the Adaptation of the Legislation of Ukraine to the Legislation of the European Union (since 08.2000); Chairman of the Interstate Council on Antitrust Policy of the CIS member states (since 2004); member of the Interdepartmental Commission on Information. policy and information. Security at the National Council. Security and Defense of Ukraine (since 2003).

Civil servant of the 1st rank (September 2001). Honored Economist of Ukraine (November 2002). Order of Merit III (January 2001), ІІ (May 2004). Diploma of the Cabinet of Ministers of Ukraine (June 2004). Order of the Holy Apostolic Grand Duke Vladimir III (04.2001), II century. (06.2006).

According to the results of the vote count in the local elections in Ukraine, which took place on October 31, 2010, the mayor of Odessa became a candidate from the Party of Regions, head of the Antimonopoly Committee of Ukraine Oleksiy Kostusev. This was announced by the chairman of the Odessa city election commission Alexander Akhmerov during a meeting of the Odessa city election commission.

In 2010, Kostusev declared an income of more than ₴1.7 million, of which one million was listed as "material assistance". The mayor later stated that he had entered in the column "material assistance" — an inheritance from a deceased friend. Subsequently, on January 31, 2011, Kostusev initiated a meeting of the Odessa City Council session where they decided that Stepan Bandera and Roman Shukhevych were not heroes of Ukraine.

On October 31, 2013 the mayor of Odessa Alexey Kostusev wrote the application for resignation of the Odessa mayor.

References

External links
 Personal website
 Profile at LIGA.net

1954 births
Living people
People from Sakhalin Oblast
Odesa National Economics University alumni
Odesa National Maritime University alumni
Academic staff of Odesa National Maritime University
Third convocation members of the Verkhovna Rada
Fifth convocation members of the Verkhovna Rada
Communist Party of Ukraine (Soviet Union) politicians
Labour Ukraine politicians
Soyuz (political party) politicians
Party of Regions politicians
Mayors of Odesa
Recipients of the Honorary Diploma of the Cabinet of Ministers of Ukraine